Khingar Khurd is a small village  located in Rawalpindi Tehsil of Rawalpindi District in the Potohar region of Pakistan. It is located in N A 63Pakistan. The total population is round about 1200 persons. Khingar tribe is a sub-caste of Bhatti Rajput. Khurd and Kalan Persian language word which means small and Big respectively when two villages have same name then it is distinguished as Kalan means Big and Khurd means Small with Village Name.

Khinger khurd is about 34 km to the southwest of Rawalpindi in the Punjab province of Pakistan.Khinger Khurd is located in the Union Council of Jhatta Hathial (UC-115).It is located on the right side of Chak Beli Khan Road when going to Chak Beli Khan, Katarian village is adjacent to village Khinger Khurd.The neighbouring villages are Dudian, Piyal,Mohra phaphra,Jhatta  Hathyal.All residents of the village are  Muslims.

References

Populated places in Rawalpindi District